Moussa Kanfideni is a Nigerien footballer of the 1970s and 1980s.

A midfielder, Kanfideni was ever-present in Niger's 1978 and 1982 World Cup qualifying campaigns, with the latter qualifiers being Niger's most notable World Cup qualifying runs to date. He captained the Niger side during the 1980s.

References

Living people
Nigerien footballers
Association footballers not categorized by position
Year of birth missing (living people)
Niger international footballers